A Matter of Conscience is a 1973 Greek film produced by Finos Films, directed by Petros Lykas and starring Nikos Kourkoulos and Betty Arvaniti.

Cast
Nikos Kourkoulos ..... Geralis
Betty Arvaniti ..... Sakellaropoulou
Zoras Tsapelis ..... Emmanouil Hatzigiorgos
Vasilis Andreopoulos
Louiza Podimata ..... Maria
Takis Christoforidis
Periklis Christoforidis
Timos Perlegas

External links

1973 films
Greek thriller drama films
1970s Greek-language films
Finos Film films
1970s thriller drama films